De Bichos y Flores is an album by uruguayan ska/rock band La Vela Puerca. It was released in the first week of October 2001 and quickly went platinum, showing a more mature side of the band's music. Several of the songs include appearances of guest artists, such as Argentine musician León Gieco.

Track listing
"Por la Ciudad" (Sebastián Teysera) – 3:02
"Por Dentro" (Teysera) – 2:37
"El Viejo" (Alejandro Balbis, Nicolás Lieutier, Teysera) – 3:07
"El Huracán" (Teysera) – 3:52
"Contradecir" (Teysera) – 4:09
"El Profeta" (Teysera) – 3:12
"Potosí" (Teysera) – 3:13
"Mañana" (Fabricio Castro, Lieutier, Teysera) – 2:28
"El Ojo Moro" (Carlos Molina, Teysera) – 2:23
"José Sabía" (Balbis, Teysera) – 3:21
"Rebuscado" (Sabastián Cabreiro) – 2:51
"Burbujas" (Lieutier, Teysera) – 4:03
"De No Olvidar" (Juan M. Lucio Muniz, Alfredo Zitarrosa) – 2:27

Personnel
Alejandro Balbis – Restoration, Muruga
Felipe Castro – Restoration, Muruga
Edoardo Chavarin – Design
Virginia Frazier – Cuerda
Raul Garcia – Muruga
Jorge "Mosquito" Garrido – Restoration, Muruga
León Gieco – Harmonica, Dialogue
Aníbal Kerpel – Organ (Hammond), Associate Producer, Mixing, Lighting Assistant
Nicolas Lieutier – Bajo Sexto
Alan Mautner – Cuerda
Alejandro Piccone – Trumpet
Coli Quijano – Saxophone
Gustavo Santaolalla – Percussion, Arranger, Vocals, Producer, Charango, Mixing, Coros
Harry Scorzo – Cuerda
Adrian Sosa – Coordination, A&R
David Stout – Trombone, Choir Arrangement
Ricardo Troilo – Engineer, Mixing

La Vela Puerca albums
2001 albums
Albums produced by Gustavo Santaolalla